Scott Wade (born 10 January 1960) is a former Australian rules football player and administrator, most notable for his sixteen-year tenure at AFL Tasmania. He played for Hawthorn in the Victorian Football League (VFL) during the early 1980s.

Wade, a Tasmanian recruit, spent three seasons at Hawthorn and made two appearances in their premiership year of 1983. A rover, he then returned to his home state and won two William Leitch Medals, firstly with Hobart in 1984 and then for Clarence in 1989. He finished his TFL career with 282 senior games and played in three premiership teams at Clarence as well as one with Hobart. Wade entered football administration in 1997 as general manager of Clarence

Wade was promoted to become the general manager of Football Tasmania (later AFL Tasmania) in 1999, and later became CEO. Less than a year into his tenure, he oversaw the collapse of the financially crippled Statewide League, and was involved in establishing the Victorian Football League's Tasmanian Devils Football Club in its place. He was involved in arranging a long-standing deal for Hawthorn to play AFL games in Launceston, and in improving the funding for Tasmanian football from the AFL. He was later involved in the revival of the statewide league in 2009, and in that position oversaw the statewide league's revamp in 2014. Nevertheless, Wade had a negative reputation with many fans, as many of the decisions made by AFL Tasmania during his tenure were unpopular. Wade held the top position in AFL Tasmania for sixteen years until his resignation on 9 March 2016.

In 2006, Wade was inducted into the Tasmanian Football Hall of Fame. His son Matthew is a Cricketer.

References

Holmesby, Russell and Main, Jim (2007). The Encyclopedia of AFL Footballers. 7th ed. Melbourne: Bas Publishing.

1960 births
Living people
Hawthorn Football Club players
Hobart Football Club players
Hobart Football Club coaches
Clarence Football Club players
William Leitch Medal winners
Australian rules football administrators
Australian rules footballers from Tasmania
Tasmanian Football Hall of Fame inductees